Ko Chang may refer to:

 Ko Chang District, in Trat Province, Thailand's third largest island
 Ko Chang, Mae Sai, a subdistrict in Chiang Rai Province, Thailand
 Ko Chang (Ranong), a small island in Ranong Province, Thailand

See also
 Geochang County, also known as Kochang, a county in South Gyeongsang, South Korea
 USS Mockingbird (AMS-27), also known as ROKS Ko Chang (MSC-521), a YMS-1-class minesweeper of the United States Navy